Peter Mullins (born 1931) is a former art director. He was active in British cinema and television production from the 1940s until the 1970s. He was married to the actress Jennifer Jayne.

His television worked included designing the sets for numerous episodes of the series The Adventures of Robin Hood, William Tell and The Invisible Man. In film he contributed to a number of the Edgar Wallace Mysteries series.

Selected filmography
 Clue of the Silver Key (1961)
 Man Detained (1961)
 The Fourth Square (1961)
 Playback (1962)
 King and Country (1964)
 The Verdict (1964)
 The Projected Man (1966)
 Alfie (1966)
 The Spy with a Cold Nose (1966)
 The Penthouse (1967)
 Pretty Polly (1967)
 The Man Outside (1967)
 Where Eagles Dare (1968)
 The Chairman (1969)
 The Last Valley (1971)
 Zee and Co. (1972)
 11 Harrowhouse (1974)
 The "Human" Factor (1975)
 The Medusa Touch (1978)

References

Bibliography 
  James Palmer & Michael Riley. The Films of Joseph Losey. Cambridge University Press, 1993.

External links 
 

1931 births
Living people
British art directors
People from London